Protease-activated receptor 4 (PAR-4), also known as coagulation factor II (thrombin) receptor-like 3, is a protein that in humans is encoded by the F2RL3 gene.

Function 

Coagulation factor II (thrombin) receptor-like 3 (F2RL3) is a member of the large family of 7-transmembrane-region receptors that couple to guanosine-nucleotide-binding proteins. F2RL3 is also a member of the protease-activated receptor family. F2RL3 is activated by proteolytic cleavage of its extracellular amino terminus. The new amino terminus functions as a tethered ligand and activates the receptor. F2RL3 is activated by thrombin and trypsin.

See also
 Protease-activated receptor

References

Further reading

Receptors
G protein-coupled receptors